Virginia Road, also known as North County Road, North Country Road and Bay Road, is a historic road in Lincoln, Massachusetts, United States. It was part of Concord until 1754. Today, it is in the care of the Minute Man National Historical Park.

The road runs from today's  Massachusetts Route 2A (North Great Road) in the east to Old Bedford Road in the west, and is located on the northern side of Battle Road, of which, in colonial Massachusetts, it was a part. It was formerly the main road connecting Lexington and Concord, two of the main towns involved in the American Revolutionary War.

It is possible that the road originally began in Lincoln, to the south. Historian Coxey Toogood noted that the road between Lincoln and Bedford "passed close by the Hartwell house and tavern" and that it "passed through Hartwell's property, and close to his tavern." A Hartwell Road runs to the north of Hanscom Field, but its relevance to the developments of the late 18th century is not known.

Another historian, Joyce Malcolm, countered the theory put forth by Toogood, after consulting the deed of Hartwell Tavern:

At this point, the road turns due north, shortly before a short stretch of an "Old Bedford Road" joins from the east. (Note that this is not the Old Bedford Road at which Virginia Road terminates in the west.)

Notable buildings and structures

The below buildings stand beside the road (from east to west):

Captain William Smith House (1692)
Hartwell Tavern (1733)
Samuel Hartwell House (1694; later Hartwell Farm restaurant; destroyed in 1973, only its central chimney and hearth remains)

References

Minute Man National Historical Park
Historic trails and roads in Massachusetts
American Revolutionary War sites in Massachusetts
Lincoln, Massachusetts